The Women's balance beam competition at the 2022 Mediterranean Games was held on 29 June 2022 at the Olympic Complex Sports Hall.

Qualification

Final

References

Women's balance beam
2022
2022 in women's gymnastics